William Francis Callahan (June 12, 1891 – April 20, 1964) was a Massachusetts civil servant who served as Commissioner of Public Works from and Chairman of the Massachusetts Turnpike Authority from 1952 until his death in 1964. Callahan proposed the idea of an authority originally named Boston-Springfield Highway Authority which was renamed to the Massachusetts Turnpike Authority.

Callahan developed the Master Highway Plan for Metropolitan Boston, which included the Southwest Corridor project. The Callahan Tunnel is named after his son who was killed in action during the Second World War. Callahan died in Newton-Wellesley Hospital as a result of suffering a heart attack in his home. He died on April 20, 1964 in Massachusetts.

References

1964 deaths
State cabinet secretaries of Massachusetts
1891 births
20th-century American politicians